Lao romanization systems are transcriptions of the Lao script into the Latin alphabet.

Tables

Consonants 
The table below shows the Lao consonant letters and their transcriptions according to IPA (International Phonetic Alphabet,) BGN/PCGN romanization (1966 system) and LC (US ALA-LC romanization,) as well as the transcriptions used in the Unicode names of the letters, and in official Lao government usage.

Vowel nuclei 
The table below shows the Lao vowel nuclei, combined with the consonant ກ.

See also 
 Romanization
 Romanization of Thai

External links
 Report on the current status of United Nations romanization systems for geographical names - Lao (PDF; this document refers to the Lao Commission Nationale de Toponymie. There is no Lao romanization system officially adopted by the UN.)
 Library of Congress romanization table for Lao (PDF)
 Unicode code chart for Lao
 ANSI Z39.35-1979, System for the Romanization of Lao, Khmer, and Pali; .

Lao language
Lao